HeroCraft is a video game developer and publisher headquartered in Nikosia and with offices in Saint Petersburg, Kaliningrad and Novokuznetsk.

HeroCraft develops for iOS, Android and Windows Phone devices as well as for Microsoft Windows and social networks and supports a variety of legacy platforms. Distribution takes place worldwide in 15 languages. HeroCraft has "Top developer" status on Google Play.

HeroCraft is now concentrating on development of Warhammer 40,000: Space Wolf and Tempest.

Flagship projects

Warhammer 40,000: Space Wolf
Warhammer 40,000: Space Wolf was announced on August 16, 2013. It is a fusion of turn-based tactical combat and collectable cards. The game is being developed in close co-operation with Games Workshop. The game’s music is composed by Cris Velasco.

Warhammer 40,000: Space Wolf was released on iOS on October 28, 2014 and on Android on July 16, 2015.

Majesty: The Fantasy Kingdom Sim (Mobile port)
Majesty: The Fantasy Kingdom Sim is a real-time strategy game developed and published by HeroCraft. The game was released on 10 December 2010 and supported iOS, Android and Windows Phone. In December 2011, HeroCraft released the sequel, Majesty: The Northern Expansion.

Released projects
HeroCraft's portfolio comprises over 100 games from an array of genres, from simple games for a casual gaming audience to complex sim, strategy and role-playing games. HeroCraft games are published both under original IP and with branded licenses.

Warhammer 40,000: Space Wolf (iOS, Android)
 Majesty: The Fantasy Kingdom Sim (iOS, Android, BlackBerry, Windows Phone)
Majesty: The Northern Expansion (iOS, Android)
 Majesty: Northern Kingdom FREE (iOS, Android)
Mafioso: Mafia 3v3 Turn－Based Strategy & Clan Wars (iOS, Android)
Strategy & Tactics: World War II (iOS, Android, Windows Phone)
 Insomnia: the Ark (PC)
 WW2: Sandbox. Strategy & Tactics (iOS, Android)
Medieval Wars: Strategy & Tactics (iOS, Android)
Strategy & Tactics: Wargame Collection (PC)
FootLOL (PC, Mac, iOS, Android)
Race Illegal: High Speed 3D (Android, Windows Phone)
Zombie Derby (iOS, Android, Windows Phone)
Zombie Derby 2 (iOS, Android, Windows Phone)
Tiny Bang Story (Android, Windows Phone)
Ant Raid (Android, Windows Phone)
Ice Rage (Android, Android TV, Windows Phone)
 Wonder Wood (iOS, Android, Windows Phone)
 Evy: Magic Spheres (PC)
 King of Dragon Pass (Android, Mac)
 Plancon: Space Conflict (iOS, Android)
 Marble Duel (iOS, Apple TV, Android, PC)
 MiniChess by Kasparov (iOS, Android)
 Jolly Days Farm  (iOS, Android)
 Pirate Battles: Corsairs Bay (Android)
 Lords of Discord (iOS, Android)
 Spell Gate: Tower Defense (Android)
 War is Peace (iOS)
 Game of Drones (Android)
 Alchemic Maze (iOS), (Android)
 World of Dungeons (iOS, Android)
 Dead Shell (iOS), (Android)
 Red Ball 3 (Android)
 Zombie Town Story (iOS)
 Tempest (Steam, iOS, Android)
 Tap Tap Builder (iOS, Android)
 Spaceship Battles (iOS, Android)
 Strategy & Tactics : Dark Ages (PC)
 Farm Frenzy (PC, iOS, Android)

External links
HeroCraft official website

Video game companies of Russia
Mobile game companies
Companies based in Kaliningrad
Video game companies established in 2002
Russian companies established in 2002
Video game development companies